is a railway station in Tenryū-ku, Hamamatsu,  Shizuoka Prefecture, Japan, operated by the third sector Tenryū Hamanako Railroad.

Lines
Futamata-Hommachi Station is served by the Tenryū Hamanako Line, and is located 26.8 kilometers from the starting point of the line at Kakegawa Station.

Station layout
The station has one island platform located on an embankment, with the station building at a lower level. The station is unattended, but half of the station building is occupied by a privately operated café.

Adjacent stations

|-
!colspan=5|Tenryū Hamanako Railroad

Station History
Futamata-Hommachi Station was established on December 15, 1956, as a passenger station on the Japan National Railways Futamata Line. After the privatization of JNR on March 15, 1987, the station came under the control of the Tenryū Hamanako Line.

Passenger statistics
In fiscal 2016, the station was used by an average of 54 passengers daily (boarding passengers only).

Surrounding area
for Tenryu City Hall

See also
 List of Railway Stations in Japan

External links

  Tenryū Hamanako Railroad Station information 
 

Railway stations in Shizuoka Prefecture
Railway stations in Japan opened in 1956
Stations of Tenryū Hamanako Railroad
Railway stations in Hamamatsu